Dating is a term coined in America to signify that stage of romantic relationships in which two individuals engage in an activity together, most often with the intention of evaluating each other's suitability as a partner in a future intimate relationship. It falls into the category of courtship, consisting of social events carried out by the couple either alone or with others. 

The meaning of dating in America shifted during the 20th century to include a more informal use referring to a romantic, sexual relationship itself beyond an introductory or trial stage. Although informal, this meaning is very common and is used in formal speech as well as writing. Although taboo across most of the world for much of history, premarital sex has become increasingly common within the last century, beginning with the onset of the sexual revolution. Across a greater number of portrayals in film, television, and music, sex within dating has become increasingly accepted as a natural progression of the relationship.

Etymology 
The earliest usage of the noun "date" is in 1896 by George Ade, a columnist for the Chicago Record.  Date referred to "public" courtship, when a woman would meet a man publicly rather than privately at a residence or at court. In Ade's 1899 "Fabels in Slang", he used the term "Date Book" to describe a type of ledger system a cashier used to track dates with suitors until she married.

Different meanings of the term 
While the term dating has many meanings, the most common refers to a trial period in which two people explore whether to take the relationship further towards a more permanent relationship; in this sense, dating refers to the time when people are physically together in public as opposed to the earlier time period in which people are arranging the date, perhaps by corresponding by email or text or phone. 

Another meaning of the term dating is to describe a stage in a person's life when he or she is actively pursuing romantic relationships with different people. If two unmarried celebrities are seen in public together, they are often described as "dating" which means they were seen in public together, and it is not clear whether they are merely friends, exploring a more intimate relationship, or are romantically involved. A related sense of the term is when two people have been out in public only a few times but have not yet committed to a relationship; in this sense, dating describes an initial trial period and can be contrasted with "being in a committed relationship".

United Kingdom 

In Britain, if two people are 'going out together,' it may mean they're dating but that their relationship has advanced to a relatively long-standing and sexual boyfriend-girlfriend relationship although they're not cohabiting. Although Britons are familiar with the term dating, the rituals surrounding courtship are somewhat different from those commonly found in North America.

As a social relationship

Wide variation in behavior patterns 

Social rules regarding dating vary considerably according to variables such as social class, race, religion, age, sexual orientation and gender. Behavior patterns are generally unwritten and constantly changing. There are considerable differences between social and personal values. 

Since dating can be stressful, there is the possibility of humor to try to reduce tensions. For example, director Blake Edwards wanted to date singing star Julie Andrews, and he joked in parties about her persona by saying that her "endlessly cheerful governess" image from movies such as Mary Poppins and The Sound of Music gave her the image of possibly having "lilacs for pubic hair"; Andrews appreciated his humor, sent him lilacs, dated him and later married him, and the couple stayed together for 41 years until his death in 2010.

Evaluation 
One of the main purposes of dating is for two or more people to evaluate one another's suitability as a long term companion or spouse.  Often physical characteristics, personality, financial status, and other aspects of the involved persons are judged and, as a result, feelings can be hurt and confidence shaken. Because of the uncertainty of the whole situation, the desire to be acceptable to the other person, and the possibility of rejection, dating can be very stressful for all parties involved. Some studies have shown that dating tends to be extremely difficult for people with social anxiety disorder.

While some of what happens on a date is guided by an understanding of basic, unspoken rules, there is considerable room to experiment, and there are numerous sources of advice available. Sources of advice include magazine articles, self-help books, dating coaches, friends, and many other sources. And the advice given can pertain to all facets of dating, including such aspects as where to go, what to say, what not to say, what to wear, how to end a date, how to flirt, and differing approaches regarding first dates versus subsequent dates. In addition, advice can apply to periods before a date, such as how to meet prospective partners, as well as after a date, such as how to break off a relationship.

There are now more than 350 businesses that offer dating coach services in the U.S., and the number of these businesses has surged since 2005 Frequency of dating varies by person and situation; among singles actively seeking partners, 36% had been on no dates in the past three months, 13% had one date, 22% had two to four dates and 25% had five or more dates, according to a 2005 U.S. survey.

Meeting places 

There are numerous ways to meet potential dates, including blind dates, classified ads, dating websites, hobbies, holidays, office romance, social networking, speed dating, or simply talking in public places, vehicles or houses. A Pew study in 2005 which examined Internet users in long-term relationships including marriage, found that many met by contacts at work or at school. The survey found that 55% of relationship-seeking singles agreed that it was "difficult to meet people where they live."  Work is a common place to meet potential spouses, although there are some indications that the Internet is overtaking the workplace as an introduction venue. One drawback of office dating is that a bad date can lead to "workplace awkwardness."

Gender differences 
There is a general perception that men and women approach dating differently, hence the reason why advice for each gender varies greatly, particularly when dispensed by popular magazines. For example, it is a common belief that heterosexual men often seek women based on beauty and youth. Psychology researchers at the University of Michigan suggested that men prefer women who seem to be "malleable and awed", and prefer younger women with subordinate jobs such as secretaries and assistants and fact-checkers rather than executive-type women. Online dating patterns suggest that men are more likely to initiate online exchanges (over 75%) and extrapolate that men are less "choosy", seek younger women, and "cast a wide net". In a similar vein, the stereotype for heterosexual women is that they seek well-educated men who are their age or older with high-paying jobs. Evolutionary psychology suggests that "women are the choosier of the genders" since "reproduction is a much larger investment for women" who have "more to lose by making bad choices."

For example, some have noted that educated women in many countries including Italy and Russia, and the United States find it difficult to have a career as well as raise a family, prompting a number of writers to suggest how women should approach dating and how to time their careers and personal life. The advice comes with the assumption that the work-life balance is inherently a "woman's problem." In many societies, there is a view that women should fulfill the role of primary caregivers, with little to no spousal support and with few services by employers or government such as parental leave or child care. Accordingly, an issue regarding dating is the subject of career timing which generates controversy. Some views reflect a traditional notion of gender roles. For example, Danielle Crittenden in What Our Mothers Didn't Tell Us argued that having both a career and family at the same time was taxing and stressful for a woman; as a result, she suggested that women should date in their early twenties with a seriousness of purpose, marry when their relative beauty permitted them to find a reliable partner, have children, then return to work in their early thirties with kids in school; Crittenden acknowledged that splitting a career path with a ten-year baby-raising hiatus posed difficulties. There are contrasting views which suggest that women should focus on careers in their twenties and thirties.

In studies comparing children with heterosexual families and children with homosexual families, there have been no major differences noted; though some claims suggest that kids with homosexual parents end up more well adjusted than their peers with heterosexual parents, purportedly due to the lack of marginalizing gender roles in same-sex families.

It is increasingly common today, however, with new generations and in a growing number of countries, to frame the work-life balance issue as a social problem rather than a gender problem. With the advent of a changing workplace, the increased participation of women in the labor force, an increasing number of men who are picking up their share of parenting and housework, and more governments and industries committing themselves to achieving gender equality, the question of whether or not, or when to start a family is slowly being recognized as an issue that touches (or should touch) both genders.

Love 
The prospect of love often entails anxiety, sometimes with a fear of commitment  and a fear of intimacy for persons of both sexes. One woman said "being really intimate with someone in a committed sense is kind of threatening" and described love as "the most terrifying thing." In her Psychology Today column, research scientist, columnist, and author Debby Herbenick compared it to a roller coaster:

One dating adviser agreed that love is risky, and wrote that "There is truly only one real danger that we must concern ourselves with and that is closing our hearts to the possibility that love exists."

Controversy 

What happens in the dating world can reflect larger currents within popular culture. For example, when the 1995 book The Rules appeared, it touched off media controversy about how men and women should relate to each other, with different positions taken by columnist Maureen Dowd of The New York Times and British writer Kira Cochrane of The Guardian and others. It has even caused anthropologists such as Helen Fisher to suggest that dating is a game designed to "impress and capture" which is not about "honesty" but "novelty", "excitement" and even "danger", which can boost dopamine levels in the brain. The subject of dating has spun off popular culture terms such as the friend zone which refers to a situation in which a dating relation evolves into a platonic non-sexual union.

Risks of violence 
Since people dating often do not know each other well, there is the risk of violence, including date rape. According to one report, there was a 10% chance of violence between students happening between a boyfriend and girlfriend, sometimes described as "intimate partner violence", over a 12–month period. A 2004 estimate was that 20% of U.S. high school girls aged 14–18 were "hit, slapped, shoved or forced into sexual activity". Violence while dating isn't limited to any one culture or group or religion, but remains an issue in different countries. (It is usually the female who is the victim, but there have been cases where males have been hurt as well.) Sara McCorquodale suggests that women meeting strangers on dates meet initially in busy public places, share details of upcoming dates with friends or family so they know where they'll be and who they'll be with, avoid revealing one's surname or address, and conduct searches on them on the Internet prior to the date. One advisor suggested: Don't leave drinks unattended; have an exit plan if things go badly; and ask a friend to call you on your cell phone an hour into the date to ask how it's going.

Commercial dating services
As technology progressed the dating world progressed as well. In a Time-line by Metro, a statistic match-making business opened in 1941, the first reality TV dating show was developed in 1965, and by the 1980s the public was introduced to video dating. Video dating was a way for singles to sit in front of a camera and tell whoever may be watching something about themselves. The process of elimination was significant because now the viewer was able hear their voice, see their face and watch their body language to determine a physical attraction to the candidates.

In online dating, individuals create profiles where they disclose personal information, photographs, hobbies, interests, religion and expectations. Then the user can search through hundreds of thousands of accounts and connect with multiple people at once which in return, gives the user more options and more opportunity to find what meets their standards. Online dating has influenced the idea of choice. In Modern Romance: An Investigation, Aziz Ansari states that one third of marriages in the United States between 2005 and 2012 met through online dating services. Today there are hundreds of sites to choose from and websites designed to fit specific needs such as Match, eHarmony, OkCupid, Zoosk, and ChristianMingle. Mobile apps, such as Grindr and Tinder allow users to upload profiles that are then judged by others on the service; one can either swipe right on a profile (indicating interest) or swipe left (which presents another possible mate).

Technology 
The Internet is shaping the way new generations date. Facebook, Skype, WhatsApp, and other applications have made remote connections possible. Particularly for the LGBTQ+ community, where the dating pool can be more difficult to navigate due to discrimination and having a 'minority' status in society.

Online dating tools are an alternate way to meet potential dates. Many people use smartphone apps such as Tinder, Grindr, or Bumble which allow a user to accept or reject another user with a single swipe of a finger. Some critics have suggested that matchmaking algorithms are imperfect and are "no better than chance" for the task of identifying acceptable partners. Others have suggested that the speed and availability of emerging technologies may be undermining the possibility for couples to have long-term meaningful relationships when finding a replacement partner has potentially become too easy.

LGBT+ 

Dating behavior of non-heterosexual individuals doesn't always reflect their self-ascribed sexual orientation. Some of them recognized from early age that they're attracted to the same sex or both/all sexes, but may initially adhere to heterosexual norms in their dating behaviors. Some individuals who identify as LGBT+ in one way or another but are questioning or haven't come out to their peers and family may wait years before they start dating their preferred sex.

According to a Psychology Today report, men who identify as homosexual recognize their same-sex attraction in their late teens or early twenties, and they tend to care more about physical attractiveness than the status of a prospective partner. Men who identify as homosexual, on average, tend to have more sexual partners, while women who identify as lesbian tend to form steadier one-on-one relationships, and tend to be less promiscuous than heterosexual women.

In India, transgender individuals and eunuchs have used internet dating to help them find partners, but there continue to be strong societal pressures which marginalize them.

Matchmakers 

People can meet other people on their own or the get-together can be arranged by someone else. Matchmaking is an art based entirely on hunches, since it is impossible to predict with certainty whether two people will like each other or not. "All you should ever try and do is make two people be in the same room at the same time," advised matchmaker Sarah Beeny in 2009, and the only rule is to make sure the people involved want to be set up. One matchmaker advised it was good to match "brains as well as beauty" and try to find people with similar religious and political viewpoints and thinks that like-minded people result in more matches, although acknowledging that opposites sometimes attract. It is easier to put several people together at the same time, so there are other candidates possible if one doesn't work out. And, after introducing people, don't meddle.

Friends as matchmakers 
Friends remain a common way for people to meet. However, the Internet promises to overtake friends in the future, if present trends continue. A friend can introduce two people who do not know each other, and the friend may play matchmaker and send them on a blind date. In The Guardian, British writer Hannah Pool was cynical about being set up on a blind date; she was told "basically he's you but in a male form" by the mutual friend. She googled her blind date's name along with the words "wife" and "girlfriend" and "partner" and "boyfriend" to see whether her prospective date was in any kind of relationship or gay; he wasn't any of these things. She met him for coffee in London and she now lives with him, sharing a home and business. When friends introduce two people who do not know each other, it is often called a blind date.

Family as matchmakers 
Parents, via their contacts with associates or neighbors or friends, can introduce their children to each other. In India, parents often place matrimonial ads in newspapers or online, and may post the resumes of the prospective bride or groom.

Matchmaking systems and services 
Dating systems can be systematic and organized ways to improve matchmaking by using rules or technology. The meeting can be in-person or live as well as separated by time or space such as by telephone or email or chat-based. The purpose of the meeting is for the two persons to decide whether to go on a date in the future.
 Speed dating consists of organized matchmaking events that have multiple single persons meet one-on-one in brief timed sessions so that singles can assess further whether to have subsequent dates. An example is meeting perhaps twenty potential partners in a bar with brief interviews between each possible couple, perhaps lasting three minutes in length, and shuffling partners. In Shanghai, one event featured eight-minute one-on-one meetings in which participants were pre-screened by age and education and career, and which costs 50 yuan (US$6) per participant; participants are asked not to reveal contact information during the brief meeting with the other person, but rather place names in cards for organizers to arrange subsequent dates. Advantages of speed dating: efficiency; "avoids an embarrassing disaster date"; cost-effective; way to make friends. Disadvantages: it can turn into a beauty contest with only a few good-looking participants getting most offers, while less attractive peers received few or no offers; critics suggest that the format prevents factors such as personality and intelligence from emerging, particularly in large groups with extra-brief meeting times.

  systems of the 1980s and 1990s especially, where customers gave a performance on (typically VHS) video, which was viewable by other customers, usually in private, in the same facility. Some services would record and play back videos for men and women on alternate days to minimize the chance that customers would meet each other on the street.
 Phone dating systems of about the same vintage, where customers call a common voice mail or phone-chat server at a common local phone number, and are connected with other (reputed) singles, and typically charged by the minute as if it were a long-distance call (often a very expensive one). A key problem of such systems was that they were hard to differentiate from a phone porn service or "phone sex" where female operators are paid to arouse male customers and have no intention of ever dating them.
 Online dating systems use websites or mobile phone apps to connect possible romantic or sexual partners.

Computers as matchmakers

Computer dating systems of the later 20th century, especially popular in the 1960s and 1970s, before the rise of sophisticated phone and computer systems, gave customers forms that they filled out with important tolerances and preferences, which were "matched by computer" to determine "compatibility" of the two customers. The history of dating systems is closely tied to the history of technologies that support them, although a statistics-based dating service that used data from forms filled out by customers opened in Newark, New Jersey in 1941.

The first large-scale computer dating system, The Scientific Marriage Foundation, was established in 1957 by Dr. George W. Crane. In this system, forms that applicants filled out were processed by an IBM card sorting machine. The earliest commercially successfully computerized dating service in either the US or UK was Com-Pat, started by Joan Ball in 1964. Operation Match, started by Harvard University students a year later is often erroneously claimed to be the "first computerized dating service." In actuality, both Com-Pat and Operation Match were preceded by other computerized dating services in Europe—the founders of Operation Match and Joan Ball of Com-Pat both stated they had heard about these European computer dating services and that those served as the inspiration for their respective ideas to create computer dating businesses.

The longest running and most successful early computer dating business, both in terms of numbers of users and in terms of profits, was Dateline, which was started in the UK in 1965 by John Patterson. Patterson's business model was not fully legal, however. He was charged with fraud on several occasions for selling lists of the women who signed up for his service to men who were looking for prostitutes. Dateline existed until Patterson's death from alcoholism in 1997, and during the early 1990s it was reported to be the most profitable computer dating company in the world.

In the early 1980s in New York City, software developers wrote algorithms to match singles romantically, sometimes using collaborative filtering technologies.

Compatibility algorithms and matching software are becoming increasingly sophisticated.

Using the Internet
Online dating services charge a fee to user to post a profile of himself or herself, perhaps using video or still images as well as descriptive data and personal preferences for dating, such as age range, hobbies, and so forth.

Online dating was a $2 billion per year industry, with an annual growth rate of 5%. The industry is dominated by a few large companies, such as EHarmony, Zoosk and InterActiveCorp, or IAC, which owns several brands including Match.com and OkCupid, and new entrants continue to emerge. In 2019, Taimi, previously targeted to gay men, was re-introduced as a dating service for all LGBTQI+ people.

Online dating businesses are thriving financially, with growth in members, service offerings, and membership fees and with many users renewing their accounts, although the overall share of Internet traffic using online dating services in the U.S. has declined from 2003 (21% of all Internet users) to 2006 (10%).

While online dating has become more accepted, it retains a slight stigma. After controversies such as the 2015 hacking of Ashley Madison user data, dating sites must work to convince users that they are safe places with quality members.

There is widespread evidence that online dating has increased rapidly and is becoming "mainstream" with new websites appearing regularly. One study suggested that 18% of single persons had used the Internet for dating purposes.

Reports vary about the effectiveness of dating web sites to result in marriages or long–term relationships. Pew Research, based on a 2005 survey of 3,215 adults, estimated that three million Americans had entered into long-term relationships or marriage as a result of meeting on a dating web site. While sites have touted marriage rates from 10% to 25%, sociologists and marriage researchers are highly skeptical that valid statistics underlie any such claims.

The Pew study (see table) suggested the Internet was becoming increasingly prominent and accepted as a way to meet people for dates, although there were cautions about deception, the risk of violence, and some concerns about stigmas. The report suggested most people had positive experiences with online dating websites and felt they were excellent ways to meet more people. The report also said that online daters tend to have more liberal social attitudes compared to the general population.

Research from Berkeley University in California suggests there is a dropoff in interest after online daters meet face-to-face. It is a lean medium not offering standard cues such as tone of voice, gestures, and facial expressions. There is substantial data about online dating habits; for example, researchers believe that "the likelihood of a reply to a message sent by one online dater to another drops roughly 0.7 percent with every day that goes by". Psychologist Lindsay Shaw Taylor found that even though people said they would be willing to date someone of a different race, that people tend to choose dates similar to themselves.

There are dating applications or apps on mobile phones.

Virtual dating incorporates elements of video-game play and dating. Users create avatars and spend time in virtual worlds in an attempt to meet other avatars with the purpose of meeting for potential dates.

Mobile dating or cellphone dating refers to exchanging text messages to express interest in others on the system. These may be web-based or online as well, depending on the company.

At a singles event, a group of singles are brought together to take part in various activities for the purposes of meeting new people. Events might include parties, workshops, and games. Many events are aimed at singles of particular affiliations, interests, or religions.

Media

Board games 
Mystery Date is a board game from the Milton Bradley Company, originally released in 1965 and reissued in 1970, 1999, and in 2005, whose object is to be ready for a date by acquiring three matching color-coded cards to assemble an outfit. The outfit must then match the outfit of the date at the "mystery door". If the player's outfit does not match the date behind the door, the door is closed and play continues. The game has been mentioned, featured, or parodied in several popular films and television shows.

Television 
Numerous television reality and game shows, past and current, address dating. For example, the dating game shows The Dating Game first aired in 1965, while more modern shows in that genre include The Manhattan Dating Project (US Movie about Dating in New York City), Blind Date, The 5th Wheel, and The Bachelor and its spinoff series, in which a high degree of support and aids are provided to individuals seeking dates. These are described more fully here and in the related article on "reality game shows" that often include or motivate romantic episodes between players.  Another category of dating-oriented reality TV shows involves matchmaking, such as Millionaire Matchmaker and Tough Love. A popular dating-themed TV show in the UK is Take Me Out.

Age groups 
Dating can happen for people in most age groups with the possible exception of young children. Teenagers and tweens have been described as dating; according to the CDC, three-quarters of eighth and ninth graders in the United States described themselves as "dating", although it is unclear what is exactly meant by this term. A 2018 study in the Journal of Youth and Adolescence found that serious dating among teenagers can have negative affects on a teenager's mood. This is most likely due to the incomplete cognitive and emotional development of teenagers that cause a lack of ability to handle the challenging aspects of romantic relationships.

Young persons are exposed to many people their own age in their high schools or secondary schools or college or universities. There is anecdotal evidence that traditional dating—one-on-one public outings—has declined rapidly among the younger generation in the United States in favor of less intimate sexual encounters sometimes known as hookups (slang), described as brief sexual experiences with "no strings attached", although exactly what is meant by the term hookup varies considerably. Dating is being bypassed and is seen as archaic, and relationships are sometimes seen as "greedy" by taking time away from other activities, although exclusive relationships form later. Some college newspapers have decried the lack of dating on campuses after a 2001 study was published, and conservative groups have promoted "traditional" dating. When young people are in school, they have a lot of access to people their own age, and do not need tools such as online websites or dating services. Chinese writer Lao Wai, writing to homeland Chinese about America, considered that the college years were the "golden age of dating" for Americans, when Americans dated more than at any other time in their life. There are indications people in their twenties are less focused on marriage but on careers.

People over thirty, lacking recent college experience, have better luck online finding partners. Economist Sylvia Ann Hewlett in 2002 found that 55% of 35-year-old career women were childless, while 19% of male corporate executives were, and concluded that "the rule of thumb seems to be that the more successful the woman, the less likely it is she will find a husband or bear a child."

While people tend to date others close to their own age, it's possible for older men to date younger women. In many countries, the older-man-younger-woman arrangement is seen as permissible, sometimes with benefits. It's looked on more positively in the U.S. than in China for example; older men are described as more knowledgeable sexually and intellectually, supportive, skilled in the ways of women, and financially more secure so there's "no more going Dutch." In China, older men with younger women are more likely to be described as "weird uncles" rather than "silver foxes." One Beijing professor reportedly advised his male students to delay dating:

A notable example of the older-woman-younger-man is Demi Moore pairing with 15-years-her-junior Ashton Kutcher. Older women in such relations have recently been described as "cougars", and formerly such relationships were often kept secret or discreet, but there is a report that such relationships are becoming more accepted and increasing.

Since divorce is increasing in many areas, sometimes celebrated with "divorce parties", there is dating advice for the freshly divorced as well, which includes not talking about your ex or your divorce, but focusing on "activities that bring joy to your life." Adviser Claire Rayner in The Guardian suggests calling people from your address book with whom you haven't been in touch for years and say "I'd love to get back in contact." Do activities you like doing with like-minded people; if someone seems interesting to you, tell them. It's more acceptable for this group for women to ask men out.

See also 
 Age disparity in sexual relationships
 Charity dating
 Courtship
 Dating coach
 Group dating
 List of online dating websites
 Online dating service
 Secret dating
 Teen dating violence
 Matchmaking

References

Bibliography

Further reading

External links
 

 
Philosophy of love
Socialization